Ourofan  (var. Ourofané) is a town in Maradi Region, Tessaoua Department south central Niger. With a mixed population of pastoral Kel Owey Tuareg, Fulani and Hausa peoples, Ourofan survives as a farming community and stop on seasonal and animal herding and trade routes.  The town, historically within the Sahel, is today on the verge of the encroaching Sahara desert.

International contacts 
The Belgian city of Chimay has a development partnership with Ourofan.

References 

 J. Cl. Toubeau. Aider le Niger : Ourofane, City of Chimay, Belgium, September 2005.
 Simon Harragin/Save the Children UK, The Cost of being Poor: Markets, mistrust and malnutrition in southern Niger 2005-2006, June 2006.

Populated places in Niger